Georges Colpaert was a Belgian wrestler. He competed in the men's Greco-Roman heavyweight at the 1928 Summer Olympics.

References

External links
 

Year of birth missing
Year of death missing
Belgian male sport wrestlers
Olympic wrestlers of Belgium
Wrestlers at the 1928 Summer Olympics
Place of birth missing